Sekolah Menengah Kebangsaan Bandar Utama Damansara (4) or SMK BUD (4) is one of four government schools in the Bandar Utama area. The school is located in front of the 1 Utama shopping complex and is adjacent to the BU3 and BU4 region. The school has commendable achievements in both academics as well as sports. SMK BUD (4) shares its compound with a primary school, Sekolah Kebangsaan Bandar Utama Damansara (4) (SK BUD4) and both schools are separated by a shared field.

History

Sekolah Menengah Kebangsaan Bandar Utama Damansara (4) opened on 1 December 2001. On 4 January 2002, the school had its first orientation day. The school's educational process was started on 7 January 2002 which was the opening date for schools around the nation that year. The school started with Form 1 students and "Remove" students who had poor academic results during their UPSR exams.  The school started with only 132 students, 13 teachers and a principal. The first principal was Puan Liu Ling Ling.

In October 2006, Puan Liu Ling Ling retired and the school hosted a farewell party for the principal in the Eastin Hotel.
The year 2006 was also the school's first batch of students who took the Sijil Pelajaran Malaysia (SPM) exam which was held in November.

In 2007, the school received a new principal, Puan Hasni Binti Hassan. However Puan Hasni was reposted and became the principal of her former school at the year-end of 2007 in the Bandar Utama region.

In March 2009, SMK Bandar Utama Damansara (4) once again changed principal due to peer pressure and excessive commotion amongst the students, parents and teachers. She was eventually reassigned to another school in Bandar Sri Damansara. The new principal, Mr. Tay Keng Lee, (BUD4's fourth principal) arrived in hopes of raising the school's SPM standards and school discipline.

In August 2010, Mr. Tay Keng Lee was posted back to his former school in SMK Seri Kembangan  to replace the newly retired principal. On 29 December 2010, Puan Ashimah Binti Ahmad, the new principal of SMKBUD4 arrived to take up the position.

Pn Ashimah was eventually posted to SMK Damansara Jaya less than a year later and the school received a new principal, Puan Normal Binti Ismail. However, she retired the following year and the school hosted a farewell party for her on 1 March 2013. Pn Misliah Binti Kulop has since taken up the position of principal until the 31st of March 2014, she has transferred away.

On 1 April 2014, Pn Zuraidah Bt. Ismail from SMK Damansara Utama, took over the helm of the school. Puan Siti Suaibah bt S. Said then came on board in March 2016 and has been the principal of the school since then.

Very recently, the new age of SMK Bandar Utama Damansara(4) has been born as the average result for SPM 2020 has skyrocketed

Society

Students
The students are filtered through several different classes. The top students are filtered to the top classes, while the not-so academically inclined ones are placed in other classes. Some classes, presumably First Classes, are without Muslim students, to make class shiftings during Islamic Studies/Chinese Language/Moral Studies easier without students walking all over the school to their classes.

At the beginning of every year, every class will select a class monitor and a sub-class monitor. These students will help to keep order in the class and perform additional tasks given by the teachers.

Every year, some students, mostly Form 2 students, will be selected/applied to certain jobs, such as the school prefects, school librarians, editorial board and quarter masters. When chosen/accepted for a specific job, the student will become a probation member and will be trained and tested to qualify for the job. Once qualified, the student will be promoted and will start doing their job and be given tasks at certain periods.

Curricular activities

The school aims to nurture all-rounded students. Apart from motivating students to do well in their studies, students are also encouraged to take part in the various clubs, societies and uniformed units as part of their extra-curricular activities.

Teachers and Faculty
The school office has a fleet of accomplished individuals, consisting of the Principal, and a staff of ex officio member, which are the Assistant Principal, the Head of Student Affairs, and Head of the Co-Curriculum Department. Also in the office are clerks who handle all the paperwork, calls and data-recording for the school. The teaching faculty has a batch of over 60 teachers, which include the Head of Discipline and other subject heads.

Principals

References

External links
SMK Bandar Utama Damansara 4 - http://www.facebook.com/smkbud4

Schools in Selangor